ANZAC is an acronym for Australian and New Zealand Army Corps.

ANZAC or Anzac may also refer to:

ANZAC (acronym)

Places
Australia
 Anzac Avenue, Brisbane
 Anzac Bridge, a bridge in Sydney
 Anzac Highway, Adelaide
 Anzac Memorial Park, Townsville
 Anzac Parade, Canberra
 Anzac Parade, Sydney
 Anzac Peak, Heard Island
 Anzac railway station, Melbourne
 Anzac Rifle Range, Malabar Headland
 Anzac Square, Brisbane
 Anzac Square Arcade, Brisbane
 Anzac Square Building, Brisbane

Canada
 Anzac, Alberta

New Zealand
 Anzac Avenue, Auckland
 Anzac Square and Anzac Avenue, Dunedin

Turkey
 Anzac Cove, on the Gallipoli peninsula

United Kingdom
 New Anzac-on-Sea, former name of Peacehaven, England

United States
 Anzac Village, New Mexico

Military
 I ANZAC Corps
 II ANZAC Corps
 ANZAC A badge
 ANZAC Battle Group, established in September 2006
 Anzac-class frigate
 ANZAC Mounted Division
 ANZAC Squadron, a short-lived 1942 naval military command
 Anzac Memorial, a Sydney military monument
 HMAS Anzac (D59), a Battle-class destroyer
 HMAS Anzac (FFH 150), a frigate commissioned in 1996 
 HMAS Anzac (G90), a Parker-class destroyer

Events
 Anzac Day
 Anzac Day Act
 Anzac Day Act (New Zealand)
 Anzac Day clash
 Anzac Day match
 ANZAC Field of Remembrance
 Anzac Test 
 Anzac Day Cup

Other uses
 Anzac biscuit
 Anzac spirit
 Anzacs, a 1985 Australian TV miniseries
 Baron Birdwood, of Anzac and of Totnes in the County of Devon

See also
 Anzac Parade (disambiguation)
 Anzac Square (disambiguation)